Neetesh Sharma (born 10 November 1982) is an Indian cricketer. He made his Twenty20 debut for Meghalaya in the 2018–19 Syed Mushtaq Ali Trophy on 21 February 2019.

References

External links
 

1982 births
Living people
Indian cricketers
Meghalaya cricketers
Place of birth missing (living people)